Jonai Assembly constituency is one of the 126 assembly constituencies of  Assam a north east state of India. Jonai is also part of Lakhimpur Lok Sabha constituency. It is a reserved seat for the scheduled tribes.

Members of Legislative Assembly
 1951: Kistobinu Rymbai, Independent
 1957: Larsingh Khyriem, Independent
 1962: Enowell Pohshna, All Party Hill Leaders Conference
 1978: Romesh Mohan Kouli, Janata Party
 1983: Puspadhar Pegu, Indian National Congress
 1985: Phani Ram Tayeng, Independent
 1991: Gomeswar Pegu, Indian National Congress
 1996: Pradan Boruah, Asom Gana Parishad
 2001: Pradan Boruah, Indian National Congress
 2006: Bhubon Pegu, Independent
 2011: Pradan Baruah, Indian National Congress
 2016: Bhubon Pegu, Independent

Election results

2016 result

See also
 Jonai
 List of constituencies of Assam Legislative Assembly

References

External links 
 

Assembly constituencies of Assam
Dhemaji district